Loomis (formerly, Pine, Pino, Smithville, and Placer) is an incorporated town in Placer County, California, United States. It is part of the Sacramento–Arden-Arcade–Roseville Metropolitan Statistical Area. The town's population was reported as 6,836 in the 2020 United States Census. It shares borders with the city of Rocklin and the Census-Designated Places Penryn and Granite Bay.

History
The Placer post office opened on the site in 1861, changed its name to Smithville in 1862, then changed it to Pino in 1869, and in 1890 the Southern Pacific Railroad finally decided on Loomis. The railroad and Post Office found that Pino was confused with the town of Reno, hence the name change to Loomis. The name Smithville honors L.G. Smith, who was one of the town's most prominent leaders.

Loomis takes its name from one of the town's pioneers, James Loomis. At one time, James Loomis was the whole town—saloon keeper, railroad agent, express agent, and postmaster.

Loomis remained part of unincorporated Placer County until December 17, 1984, when the Town of Loomis officially incorporated. The Town was in danger of being annexed by its neighbor Rocklin and the residents voted to incorporate to preserve local control, partly on the issue of preserving the "small town" character and historic structures such as the High Hand and Blue Goose fruit packing sheds which sit between Taylor Road (a segment of historic Highway 40) and the Union Pacific Railroad tracks.

Geography
Stream drainages in Loomis are Antelope Creek and Secret Ravine.

Climate
Loomis has a hot-summer Mediterranean climate (Köppen Csa) that is characterized by cool, wet winters and hot, dry summers. As with the rest of cities in the northern Central Valley, Loomis has hot summers with sparse rainfall and abundant sunshine. Winters are cool and bring plenty of rain. Average daily high temperatures range from 53 °F (12 °C) in January to 94 °F (34 °C) in July with August remaining nearly as hot. Daily low temperatures range from 39 °F in winter to 61 °F in summer (4 to 16 °C). Snowfall is almost non-existent in Loomis.

Demographics

2010
At the 2010 census Loomis had a population of 6,430. The racial makeup of Loomis was 5,733 (89.2%) White, 33 (0.5%) African American, 74 (1.2%) Native American, 169 (2.6%) Asian, 12 (0.2%) Pacific Islander, 149 (2.3%) from other races, and 260 (4.0%) from two or more races. Hispanic or Latino of any race were 568 people (8.8%).

The census reported that 6,409 people (99.7% of the population) lived in households, 5 (0.1%) lived in non-institutionalized group quarters, and 16 (0.2%) were institutionalized.

There were 2,356 households, 832 (35.3%) had children under the age of 18 living in them, 1,361 (57.8%) were opposite-sex married couples living together, 266 (11.3%) had a female householder with no husband present, 138 (5.9%) had a male householder with no wife present. There were 142 (6.0%) unmarried opposite-sex partnerships, and 16 (0.7%) same-sex married couples or partnerships. 453 households (19.2%) were one person and 194 (8.2%) had someone living alone who was 65 or older. The average household size was 2.72. There were 1,765 families (74.9% of households); the average family size was 3.10.

The age distribution was 1,588 people (24.7%) under the age of 18, 510 people (7.9%) aged 18 to 24, 1,377 people (21.4%) aged 25 to 44, 2,121 people (33.0%) aged 45 to 64, and 834 people (13.0%) who were 65 or older. The median age was 42.1 years. For every 100 females, there were 97.8 males.  For every 100 females age 18 and over, there were 92.8 males.

There were 2,465 housing units at an average density of 339.2 per square mile, of the occupied units 1,830 (77.7%) were owner-occupied and 526 (22.3%) were rented. The homeowner vacancy rate was 1.2%; the rental vacancy rate was 4.9%. 4,911 people (76.4% of the population) lived in owner-occupied housing units and 1,498 people (23.3%) lived in rental housing units.

2000
At the 2000 census there were 6,260 people, 2,206 households, and 1,729 families in the town. The racial makeup of the town was 89.06% White, 0.19% African American, 0.96% Native American, 3.23% Asian, 0.18% Pacific Islander, 2.01% from other races, and 4.38% from two or more races. Hispanic or Latino of any race were 6.87%.

Of the 2,206 households 39.1% had children under the age of 18 living with them, 62.3% were married couples living together, 11.1% had a female householder with no husband present, and 21.6% were non-families. 16.8% of households were one person and 6.6% were one person aged 65 or older. The average household size was 2.82 and the average family size was 3.17.

The age distribution was 28.8% under the age of 18, 6.4% from 18 to 24, 27.6% from 25 to 44, 25.5% from 45 to 64, and 11.7% 65 or older. The median age was 38 years. For every 100 females, there were 98.7 males. For every 100 females age 18 and over, there were 94.3 males.

The median household income was $60,444 and the median family income  was $64,837. Males had a median income of $50,458 versus $31,140 for females. The per capita income for the town was $30,384. About 2.5% of families and 3.4% of the population were below the poverty line, including 3.4% of those under age 18 and 0.4% of those age 65 or over.

Culture 
The biggest event in Loomis is the Eggplant Festival which offers entertainment, arts and crafts, food, and children's activities. 2012 was the 25th anniversary of the Eggplant Festival. Smaller festivities include the Loomis Friday Night Family Fest during summer and the Cowpoke Fall Gathering.

Economy 
Loomis has a small downtown centered around Taylor Road and Horseshoe Bar Road which includes a Raley's Supermarket, numerous small restaurants, and an assortment of small shops.

As of May 2019 Loomis was estimated to have a civilian workforce of 3,793 representing 59% of the total population. Approximately 30.1% of the population has a bachelor's degree or higher.

The median household income was estimated to be $75,691 in 2017 with a per capita income of $38,415. An estimated 7.6% of the population were considered persons in poverty.

In 2012, Loomis had 835 registered businesses. 454 were considered men-owned, 153 were considered woman-owned, 133 were considered minority-owned, and 150 were considered veteran-owned.

Education
Loomis is home to Del Oro High School. Foundation elementary schools for Del Oro High School are Placer Elementary School, Franklin Elementary School, Loomis Grammar School, H. Clarke Powers Elementary School, Penryn School, Ophir STEAM Academy, Newcastle School, and  Loomis Basin Charter School.

Infrastructure 
Loomis is bisected by Interstate 80.

Notable people
Taylor Lewan, offensive tackle for the Tennessee Titans.
Hobo Johnson, vocalist and front man of Hobo Johnson and the LoveMakers.
Alex Obert, Current captain of Team USA's Water Polo team, competed in the 2016 Summer Olympics.
Randy Fasani – former NFL quarterback
James Irvin – professional MMA fighter
Mark McLemore – MLB pitcher for Minnesota Twins
Don Verlin – men's basketball head coach at University of Idaho
Sally Edwards – member of Triathlon Hall of Fame
Thomas E. Cooper – former Assistant Secretary of the Air Force through 1987
Michael Anton – conservative essayist and former deputy assistant to the president for strategic communications
Jack Wood - driver in the NASCAR Camping World Truck Series for GMS Racing
Dean S. Laird -U.S. World War II flying ace

References

External links

 
Town of Loomis official website Portal style website, Government, Business, Library, Recreation and more
City-Data.com Comprehensive Statistical Data and more about Loomis

Cities in Placer County, California
Cities in Sacramento metropolitan area
1861 establishments in California
Populated places established in 1861
Incorporated cities and towns in California